Pir Syed Meher Ali Shah Hanfi Qadri Chisti ؓ (14 April 1859 – May 1937), was a Sufi, a great scholar and a mystic Punjabi poet from Punjab, British India (present-day Pakistan) belonging to the Chishti order. He is known as a Hanafi scholar who led the anti-Ahmadiyya movement. He wrote several books, most notably Saif e Chishtiyai ("The Sword of the Chishti Order"), a polemical work criticizing the Ahmadiyya movement of Mirza Ghulam Ahmad.

Shah was a descendant, from his father Nazr Din Shah's side, of Abdul Qadir Jilani in the 25th generation, and of the Islamic prophet Muhammad through Hassan Ibn-e-Ali in the 38th generation. On the side of his mother Masuma Mawsufa, he descended from Abdul Qadir Jilani in the 24th generation and from Muhammad through Hussain Ibn-e-Ali in the 37th generation.

Education 
He received his early religious education at the Khanqah (school at the mausoleum) and was given classes in Urdu and Persian in the local Madressah. After completing his education at Angah at the age of 15, he decided to continue further studies in the United Provinces (U.P) of India. He therefore set out for higher education in different parts of India such as Lucknow, Deoband, Rampur, Kanpur, Aligarh, Delhi and Saharanpur, which were the then known major centers of religious education. His stay at Aligarh at the madrasah of Lutfullah of Aligarh was for two and a half years.

Works 

 Tahqiq-ul-Haq Fi Kalima-tul-Haq (The Truth about Kalima-tul-Haq)
 Shamsul Hidayah
 Saif-e-Chishtiya
 I’la Kalimatillah Fi Bayan-e-Wa Ma Uhilla Bihi Legharillah
 AlFatuhat-us-Samadiyyah (Divine Bounties)
 Tasfiah Mabain Sunni Wa Shi’ah
 Fatawa-e-Mehria
 Mulfuzaat-e-Mehria (Sayings of Meher Ali Shah)
 Fight against Ahmaddiya Movement

Religious beliefs 

Shah was a disciple and Khalifa of Khawaja Shams-ud-din Sialvi of Sial Sharif in the Silsila-e-Chishtia Nizamiyah. His biography Meher-e-Muneer records that he was also made a khalifa by Imdadullah Muhajir Makki, when he visited the latter in Mecca.

Shah was a supporter of Ibn Arabi's ideology of Wahdat-ul-Wujood but he made a distinction between the creation and the creator (as did Ibn Arabi). He also wrote explaining the "Unity of Being" doctrine of Ibn Arabi.

Like his comrade Qazi Mian Muhammad Amjad, he was an authority on Ibn Arabi and his 37-volume work The Meccan Illuminations (Al-Futūḥāt al-Makkiyya).

In 1933, Shah was absorbed in his meditation and mystic trances. That year the philosopher Muhammad Iqbal had to give a lecture at Cambridge University on Ibn Arabi's concept of Space and Time. He wrote a letter to the Shah stating that now there was nobody in all of Hindustan whom he could consult in this matter, and requesting him to tell about Ibn Arabi's work. The Shah however, due to his meditation and bad health, could not reply.

Historic mosque's construction
In the old city of Rawalpindi, a historic Mughal style mosque (Central Jamia Masjid) was built in 1903 as a symbol of Muslim unity in the Potohar region with donations by Rawalpindi's Muslim community. This mosque was completed in two years and was inaugurated by the Sufi saint of Golra Sharif, Pir Meher Ali Shah along with the deposed king of Afghanistan Ayub Khan who was living in Rawalpindi at the time.

Prominent Muslim figures of the Pakistan Movement such as Maulana Zafar Ali Khan, Attaullah Shah Bukhari and Maulana Anwar Shah Kashmiri later led prayers at this historic mosque, when they visited it.

Death 
In the early part of the month of Safar 1356-A.H (April 1937), he had an attack of cold, which soon developed into typhoid fever, which lasted for several days. His condition grew worse during the last days of Safar. On the morning of 29 Safar (11 May 1937), the pulse became irregular and the body temperature also underwent sudden changes.

Just before the arrival of the final irrevocable moment, he pronounced the words “Allah” from the deepest recesses of his heart in a manner which sent a shudder throughout his body from head to foot, and the reverberation of which was felt by every one who happened to touch the body. The next moment, he repeated the word “Allah” a second time and then turned his head towards the Qibla, thus signaling that the end had finally come.

His three-day Urs (annual death anniversary) is held every year from 27th to 29th Safar. Thousands of devotees come from all over Pakistan to visit the tomb of this early twentieth century Punjabi mystic sufi poet, Pir Meher Ali Shah.

Honors 
Pakistan Post issued a commemorative postage stamp in its Sufi saint series (2013) to pay tribute to him.
Pir Mehr Ali Shah Arid Agriculture University located at Murree Road Rawalpindi is named after him.

See also 
Naseer-uddin-Naseer

References

External links

 Family Tree

1859 births
1937 deaths
19th-century imams
19th-century Islamic religious leaders
19th-century Muslim scholars of Islam
20th-century imams
20th-century Islamic religious leaders
20th-century Muslim scholars of Islam
Chishti Order
Chishtis
Dargahs in Pakistan
Hanafis
Maturidis
Metaphysicians
People from British India
Iranian scholars
Punjabi Sufis
Sufi shrines in Pakistan
Sunni fiqh scholars
Sunni imams
Sunni Muslim scholars of Islam
Critics of Ahmadiyya
People from Islamabad
Hashemite people